The First Baptist Church in Hardin, Montana, at 524 N. Custer Ave., was built in 1931.  It was listed on the National Register of Historic Places in 1991.

It is a one-story Craftsman style log building.

It was designed by Edelbert Morisette, a French-Canadian, who could communicate the plan only via a model.

References

Log buildings and structures on the National Register of Historic Places in Montana
American Craftsman architecture in Montana
Baptist churches in Montana
National Register of Historic Places in Big Horn County, Montana
Churches completed in 1931
1931 establishments in Montana